The Czech Ladies Open is a professional golf tournament on the Ladies European Tour, first played in 2019.

The tournament is played in Beroun just outside Prague, Czech Republic. The inaugural event was held at Karlštejn Golf Resort, overlooked by Karlštejn Castle and host to the 1997 Czech Open. For the 2019 season it became the second dual ranking event with LET on the LET Access Series, after the Jabra Ladies Open.

Winners

References

External links

Ladies European Tour
Karlštejn Golf Resort

Ladies European Tour events
LET Access Series events
Golf tournaments in the Czech Republic